Peter Fletcher (born 2 December 1953) is an English former footballer who played as a forward. Born in Manchester, he played in the Football League for Manchester United, Hull City, Stockport County and Huddersfield Town before retiring in 1982, at age 29.

Fletcher played mainly in the reserve team for Manchester United, before moving to Hull City as part of the deal that took Stuart Pearson to United for £200,000.

References

External links
 

1953 births
Living people
Footballers from Manchester
English footballers
Association football forwards
Manchester United F.C. players
Hull City A.F.C. players
Stockport County F.C. players
Huddersfield Town A.F.C. players
English Football League players